Cathy Compton is the former head softball coach at LSU, Nicholls State and Eureka College. She had an overall record of 412–143–4.

Born in Binghamton, New York, Compton graduated from the State University of New York at Cortland, where she lettered in basketball and softball.

Coaching career

LSU
Compton led the LSU Tigers softball team from 1997 to 1998 after the program was revived after 16 years. Compton posted a 100–26 overall record at LSU, including a 41–12 record in SEC play. She won two SEC Western Division championships and advanced to the NCAA Regional in 1998.

Nicholls State
Compton was also head coach of the Nicholls State Colonels softball team from 1991 to 1995. She had an overall record of 200–80–4.

Eureka College
Compton's first head coaching job was at Eureka College from 1987 to 1990.

References

Living people
American softball coaches
LSU Tigers softball coaches
Nicholls Colonels softball coaches
Year of birth missing (living people)
Sportspeople from Binghamton, New York
Softball players from New York (state)
State University of New York at Cortland alumni
University of Iowa alumni